David T. Beito (born 1956) is a historian and professor of history at the University of Alabama.

Biography
Beito was born in Minneapolis, Minnesota.  He received a B.A. in history from the University of Minnesota in 1980 and a Ph.D in history from the University of Wisconsin–Madison in 1986. Since 1994, he has taught at the University of Alabama, where he is a professor in history. He married Linda Royster Beito on June 11, 1997 and they live in Northport, Alabama.

Beito's research covers a wide range of topics in American history including race, tax revolts, the private provision of infrastructure, mutual aid, and the political philosophies of Zora Neale Hurston, Rose Wilder Lane, and Isabel Paterson.

Beito has published in the Journal of Interdisciplinary History, Journal of Policy History, Journal of Southern History, and Journal of Urban History among other scholarly journals.  He has received fellowships from the Earhart Foundation, the John M. Olin Foundation, and the Institute for Humane Studies.

He writes frequently on current controversies related to academic freedom and academic standards including the speech code issue, the Academic Bill of Rights and grade inflation.  He is a former president of the Alabama Scholars Association. In February 2007, Beito was appointed to chair the Alabama State Advisory Committee of the United States Commission on Civil Rights. In April, 2008, the Committee had an open meeting at the 16th Street Baptist Church in Birmingham which focused on eminent domain as a possible civil rights issue. It followed this up with another open meeting in April 2009 in Montgomery.  Witnesses alleged that the city of Montgomery has arbitrarily used "eminent domain through the back door" (via selective use of nuisance and blight laws) to demolish buildings owned by minorities and the poor.  These allegations generated stories by ABC News, Fox News, and other outlets.

Beito manages the Facebook group for classical liberal and libertarian historians, Cliolibertarian.

Books 
 T.R.M. Howard: Doctor, Entrepreneur, Civil Rights Pioneer (Oakland: Independent Institute), 2018. .
 Taxpayers in Revolt: Tax Resistance during the Great Depression, University of North Carolina Press (Chapel Hill), 1989.
 From Mutual Aid to the Welfare State: Fraternal Societies and Social Services, University of North Carolina Press (Cambridge), 1992.
 Black Maverick: T. R. M. Howard's Fight for Civil Rights and Economic Power (University of Illinois Press), 2009,

Edited books
 The Voluntary City: Choice, Community, and Civil Society, University of Michigan Press for The Independent Institute (Ann Arbor), 2002.

Selected articles and chapters in collections

 New Deal Mass Surveillence: The “Black Inquisition Committee,” 1935–1936. Journal of Policy History 30 (April 2018), 169-201. 
 https://www.independent.org/pdf/tir/tir_20_04_01_beito-beito.pdf  The 'Lodger Evil' and the Transformation of Progressive Housing Reform, 1890-1930.] Independent Review 20 (Spring 2016), 485–508.
   Selling Laissez-faire Anti-Racism to the Black Masses" Rose Wilder Lane and the Pittsburgh Courier. Independent Review 15. (Fall 2010), 279–294.
 Let Down Your Bucket Where You Are':The Afro-American Hospital and Black Health Care in Mississippi, 1924–1966, Social Science History 30 (Winter 2006), 551–569.
 Blacks, Gun Cultures and Gun Control: T. R. M. Howard, Armed Self Defense, and the Struggle for Civil Rights in Mississippi, The Journal of Firearms and Public Policy (September 2005).
 Isabel Paterson, Rose Wilder Lane, and Zora Neale Hurston on War, Race, the State, and Liberty,, Independent Review 12 (Spring 2008).
 T. R. M. Howard: Pragmatism over Strict Integrationist Ideology in the Mississippi Delta, 1942–1954, Glenn Feldman, ed., Before Brown: Civil Rights and White Backlash in the Modern South, University of Alabama Press (Tuscaloosa), 2004.
 T. R. M. Howard: A Mississippi Doctor in Chicago Civil Rights, A.M.E. Church Review (July–September 2001), 51–59.
 "Rival Road Builders: Private Toll Roads in Nevada, 1852–1880," Nevada Historical Society Quarterly 41 (Summer 1998), 71–91.
 "From Privies to Boulevards: The Private Supply of Infrastructure in the United States during the Nineteenth Century" in Jerry Jenkins and David Sisk, eds., Development by Consent: The Voluntary Supply of Public Goods and Services, San Francisco: ICS Press, 1993, 23–48.
 The Formation of Urban Infrastructure through Non-Governmental Planning: The Private Places of St. Louis, 1869–1920, Journal of Urban History 16 (May 1990), 263–301.
 "Gold Democrats and the Decline of Classical Liberalism, 1896–1900," Independent Review 4 (Spring 2000), 555–75.
 "The Christian Conservative Who Opposed the Vietnam War"  History News Network, August 21, 2006.
 Why It's Unlikely the Emmett Till Murder Will Ever Be Solved, History News Network
 Why the '60 Minutes' Story on Emmett Till Was a Disappointment,  History News Network, May 6, 2005.
 The Grim and Overlooked Anniversary of the Murder of the Rev. George W. Lee, Civil Rights Activist  History News Network, May 6, 2005.
 The AHA's Double Standard on Academic Freedom (with Ralph E. Luker, and Robert K. C. Johnson) Perspectives, March 2006.

Reviews of Beito's work and interviews
 Mark Bauerlin, "Demanding Rights, Courting Controversy: A Flamboyant Civil-Rights Leader – Doctor, Orator, Activist-Finally Gets His Due", The Wall Street Journal, August 6, 2009.
 "Six Questions for David Beito, Author of Black Maverick", by Scott Horton, Harper's Magazine, June 11, 2009.

References

External links
 T. R. M. Howard Webpage
 Liberty and Power Group Blog
 

1956 births
Living people
21st-century American historians
21st-century American male writers
21st-century American non-fiction writers
American bloggers
American book editors
American libertarians
American male bloggers
American male non-fiction writers
American political writers
Earhart Foundation Fellows
Historians from Alabama
Historians from Minnesota
Historians of the United States
Libertarian historians
University of Alabama faculty
University of Minnesota College of Liberal Arts alumni
University of Wisconsin–Madison College of Letters and Science alumni
Writers from Minneapolis